Unary may refer to:
Unary numeral system, the simplest numeral system to represent natural numbers
Unary function, a function that takes one argument; in computer science, a unary operator is a subset of unary function
Unary operation, a kind of mathematical operator that has only one operand
Unary relation, a mathematical relation that has one argument
Unary coding, an entropy encoding that represents a number n with n − 1 ones followed by a zero

See also
 Primary (disambiguation)
 Binary (disambiguation)